El Imparcial, founded in 1918, was "an anti-Popular, pro-Independence tabloid" in Puerto Rico. It circulated daily, except Sundays. Its full name was El Imparcial: El diario ilustrado de Puerto Rico.

El Imparcial was given new life in 1933 under the leadership of Antonio Ayuso Valdivieso. The paper Valdivieso bought that year for $2,000 at an auction was described as a "floundering literary periodical" in his obituary; under his leadership it became Puerto Rico's second largest newspaper (after El Mundo). He sought to emulate the New York Daily News. Valdivieso , who had headed the nationalist party prior to acquiring the paper, penned editorials arguing for Puerto Rican independence.

Though a contemporary story in Editor & Publisher described the paper as "frowned upon by intellectuals and ridiculed by reformers," the paper grew to a circulation of 65,000, making it the most widely-read publication on the island. Its reporting on government corruption in the 1940s resulted in an important court precedent on freedom of the press and government transparency. Valdivieso was incapacitated by illness in the early 1960s, and his second wife took over the business management of the paper. In the late 1960s the family brought in new management, which made a number of changes, including softening the pro-independence stance. Circulation dropped significantly. Valdivieso died in 1970.

In the 1970s Miguel A. García Méndez bought the newspaper. The headquarters of the newspaper were destroyed by arson in an act of political sabotage. The paper somewhat recovered and kept running for a short time after that with only one-third of its employees. Eventually, the government expropriated the building where it was located. The last known issue of the paper is dated 28 February 1973 (Año 38, núm. 14,210). However, La Casa de la Herencia Cultural Puertorriqueña in New York City has editions of the newspaper spanning many years.   After its demise, many of its reporters, photojournalists and editors went on to form part of the then newly created El Vocero newspaper, which many in Puerto Rico consider its successor.

Contributing writers
Among the more prominent journalists with El Imparcial were Luis Pales Matos, Angel Rivero Mendez, Hector Campos Parsi, Rafael Pont Flores, and Luis Rechani Agrait. Other contributors were Carmen Mirabal, Aida Zorrilla, Miguel Angel Yumet, Luis Colón, Victor M. Padilla and Millie Cappalli Arango.

Circulation
From 1964-65, its Monday thru Saturday average daily circulation was 51,119.

Notes

References

Defunct newspapers published in Puerto Rico
Spanish-language newspapers published in Puerto Rico
Publications disestablished in 1973